Computer forensics (also known as computer forensic science) is a branch of digital forensic science pertaining to evidence found in computers and digital storage media. The goal of computer forensics is to examine digital media in a forensically sound manner with the aim of identifying, preserving, recovering, analyzing and presenting facts and opinions about the digital information.

Although it is most often associated  with the investigation of a wide variety of computer crime, computer forensics may also be used in civil proceedings. The discipline involves similar techniques and principles to data recovery, but with additional guidelines and practices designed to create a legal audit trail.

Evidence from computer forensics investigations is usually subjected to the same guidelines and practices of other digital evidence. It has been used in a number of high-profile cases and is accepted as reliable within U.S. and European court systems.

Overview
In the early 1980s, personal computers became more accessible to consumers, leading to their increased use in criminal activity (for example, to help commit fraud). At the same time, several new "computer crimes" were recognized (such as cracking). The discipline of computer forensics emerged during this time as a method to recover and investigate digital evidence for use in court. Since then, computer crime and computer-related crime has grown, with the FBI reporting a suspected 791,790 internet crimes alone in 2020, a 69% increase over the amount reported in 2019.  Today, computer forensics is used to investigate a wide variety of crime, including child pornography, fraud, espionage, cyberstalking, murder, and rape. The discipline also features in civil proceedings as a form of information gathering (for example, Electronic discovery)

Forensic techniques and expert knowledge are used to explain the current state of a digital artifact, such as a computer system, storage medium (e.g., hard disk or CD-ROM), or an electronic document (e.g., an email message or JPEG image). The scope of a forensic analysis can vary from simple information retrieval to reconstructing a series of events. In a 2002 book, Computer Forensics, authors Kruse and Heiser define computer forensics as involving "the preservation, identification, extraction, documentation and interpretation of computer data". They go on to describe the discipline as "more of an art than a science", indicating that forensic methodology is backed by flexibility and extensive domain knowledge. However, while several methods can be used to extract evidence from a given computer, the strategies used by law enforcement are fairly rigid and lack the flexibility found in the civilian world.

Cybersecurity 
Computer forensics is often confused with cybersecurity. Cybersecurity is about prevention and protection, while computer forensics is more reactionary and active, involving activities such as tracking and exposing. System security usually encompasses two teams, cybersecurity and computer forensics, which work together. A cybersecurity team creates systems and programs to protect data; if these fail, then the computer forensics team recovers the data and performs the investigation into the intrusion and theft. Both areas require knowledge of computer science.

Computer-related crimes 
Computer forensics are used to convict those involved in physical and digital crimes. Some of these computer-related crimes include interruption, interception, copyright infringement, and fabrication. Interruption relates to the destruction and stealing of computer parts and digital files. Interception is the unauthorized access of files and information stored on technological devices. Copyright Infringement is using, reproducing, and distributing copyrighted information, including software piracy. Fabrication is accusing someone of using false data and information put in the system through an unauthorized source. Examples of interceptions are the Bank NSP case, Sony.Sambandh.com case, and business email compromise scams. In the Bank NSP case, a bank's management employee's ex-girlfriend created fraudulent emails that were sent to the bank client to obtain money. The Bank NSP case was a call center worker using a foreigner's credit card information to buy a TV and headphones. The business email compromise scams refer to hackers gaining access to the CEO/CFO email and using it to gain money from their employees.

Use as evidence
In court, computer forensic evidence is subject to the usual requirements for digital evidence. This requires that information be authentic, reliably obtained, and admissible. Different countries have specific guidelines and practices for evidence recovery. In the United Kingdom, examiners often follow Association of Chief Police Officers guidelines that help ensure the authenticity and integrity of evidence. While voluntary, the guidelines are widely accepted in British courts.

Computer forensics has been used as evidence in criminal law since the mid-1980s, some notable examples include:
 BTK Killer: Dennis Rader was convicted of a string of serial killings that occurred over a period of sixteen years. Towards the end of this period, Rader sent letters to the police on a floppy disk. Metadata within the documents implicated an author named "Dennis" at "Christ Lutheran Church"; this evidence helped lead to Rader's arrest.
 Joseph Edward Duncan: A spreadsheet recovered from Duncan's computer contained evidence that showed him planning his crimes. Prosecutors used this to show premeditation and secure the death penalty.
 Sharon Lopatka: Hundreds of emails on Lopatka's computer lead investigators to her killer, Robert Glass.
 Corcoran Group: This case confirmed parties' duties to preserve digital evidence when litigation has commenced or is reasonably anticipated. Hard drives were analyzed by a computer forensics expert who could not find relevant emails the Defendants should have had.  Though the expert found no evidence of deletion on the hard drives, evidence came out that the defendants were found to have intentionally destroyed emails, and misled and failed to disclose material facts to the plaintiffs and the court.
 Dr. Conrad Murray: Dr. Conrad Murray, the doctor of the deceased Michael Jackson, was convicted partially by digital evidence on his computer.  This evidence included medical documentation showing lethal amounts of propofol.

Forensic process

Computer forensic investigations usually follow the standard digital forensic process or phases which are acquisition, examination, analysis and reporting. Investigations are performed on static data (i.e. acquired images) rather than "live" systems. This is a change from early forensic practices where a lack of specialist tools led to investigators commonly working on live data.

Computer forensics lab 
The computer forensic lab is a safe and protected zone where electronic data can be managed, preserved, and accessed in a controlled environment. There, there is a very much reduced risk of damage or modification to the evidence. Computer forensic examiners have the resources needed to elicit meaningful data from the devices that they are examining.

Techniques
A number of techniques are used during computer forensics investigations and much has been written on the many techniques used by law enforcement in particular.

Cross-drive analysis
 A forensic technique that correlates information found on multiple hard drives. The process, still being researched, can be used to identify social networks and to perform anomaly detection.

Live analysis
 The examination of computers from within the operating system using custom forensics or existing sysadmin tools to extract evidence. The practice is useful when dealing with Encrypting File Systems, for example, where the encryption keys may be collected and, in some instances, the logical hard drive volume may be imaged (known as a live acquisition) before the computer is shut down.

Deleted files
 A common technique used in computer forensics is the recovery of deleted files. Modern forensic software have their own tools for recovering or carving out deleted data. Most operating systems and file systems do not always erase physical file data, allowing investigators to reconstruct it from the physical disk sectors. File carving involves searching for known file headers within the disk image and reconstructing deleted materials.

Stochastic forensics
A method which uses stochastic properties of the computer system to investigate activities lacking digital artifacts. Its chief use is to investigate data theft.

Steganography
 One of the techniques used to hide data is via steganography, the process of hiding data inside of a picture or digital image. An example would be to hide pornographic images of children or other information that a given criminal does not want to have discovered. Computer forensics professionals can fight this by looking at the hash of the file and comparing it to the original image (if available.) While the images appear identical upon visual inspection, the hash changes as the data changes.

Mobile device forensics 
Phone Logs: Phone companies usually keep logs of calls received, which can be helpful when creating timelines and gathering the locations of persons when the crime occurred.

Contacts: Contact lists help narrow down the suspect pool due to their connections with the victim or suspect.

Text messages: Messages contain timestamps and remain in company servers indefinitely, even if deleted on the original device. Because of this, messages act as crucial records of communication that can be used to convict suspects.

Photos: Photos can be critical in either supporting or disproving alibis by displaying a location or scene along with a timestamp of when the photo was taken.

Audio Recordings: Some victims might have been able to record pivotal moments of the struggle, like the voice of their attacker or extensive context of the situation.

Volatile data
Volatile data is any data that is stored in memory, or exists in transit, that will be lost when the computer loses power or is turned off. Volatile data resides in registries, cache, and random access memory (RAM). The investigation of this volatile data is called “live forensics”.

When seizing evidence, if the machine is still active, any information stored solely in RAM that is not recovered before powering down may be lost. One application of "live analysis" is to recover RAM data (for example, using Microsoft's COFEE tool, WinDD, WindowsSCOPE) prior to removing an exhibit. CaptureGUARD Gateway bypasses Windows login for locked computers, allowing for the analysis and acquisition of physical memory on a locked computer.

RAM can be analyzed for prior content after power loss, because the electrical charge stored in the memory cells takes time to dissipate, an effect exploited by the cold boot attack. The length of time that data is recoverable is increased by low temperatures and higher cell voltages. Holding unpowered RAM below −60 °C helps preserve residual data by an order of magnitude, improving the chances of successful recovery. However, it can be impractical to do this during a field examination.

Some of the tools needed to extract volatile data, however, require that a computer be in a forensic lab, both to maintain a legitimate chain of evidence, and to facilitate work on the machine. If necessary, law enforcement applies techniques to move a live, running desktop computer.  These include a mouse jiggler, which moves the mouse rapidly in small movements and prevents the computer from going to sleep accidentally.  Usually, an uninterruptible power supply (UPS) provides power during transit.

However, one of the easiest ways to capture data is by actually saving the RAM data to disk.  Various file systems that have journaling features such as NTFS and ReiserFS keep a large portion of the RAM data on the main storage media during operation, and these page files can be reassembled to reconstruct what was in RAM at that time.

Analysis tools

A number of open source and commercial tools exist for computer forensics investigation. Typical forensic analysis includes a manual review of material on the media, reviewing the Windows registry for suspect information, discovering and cracking passwords, keyword searches for topics related to the crime, and extracting e-mail and pictures for review. Autopsy (software), Belkasoft Evidence Center, COFEE, EnCase are the some of tools used in Digital forensics.

Jobs in computer forensics

Digital forensics analyst 
A digital forensics analyst is responsible for preserving digital evidence, cataloging collected evidence, analyzing evidence in a manner relevant to the ongoing case, responding to cyber breaches (usually in a corporate context), writing reports containing findings, and testifying in court. A digital forensic analyst may alternatively be referred to as a computer forensic analyst, digital forensic examiner, cyber forensic analyst, forensic technician, or other similarly named titles, although these roles perform the same duties.

Certifications
There are several computer forensics certifications available, such as the ISFCE Certified Computer Examiner, Digital Forensics Investigation Professional (DFIP) and IACRB Certified Computer Forensics Examiner.

The top vendor independent certification (especially within EU) is considered the CCFP - Certified Cyber Forensics Professional.

Others, worth to mention for USA or APAC are:
The International Association of Computer Investigative Specialists offers the Certified Computer Examiner program.

The International Society of Forensic Computer Examiners offers the Certified Computer Examiner program.

Many commercial based forensic software companies are now also offering proprietary certifications on their products. For example, Guidance Software offering the (EnCE) certification on their tool EnCase, AccessData offering (ACE) certification on their tool FTK, PassMark Software offering certification on their tool OSForensics, and X-Ways Software Technology offering (X-PERT) certification for their software, X-Ways Forensics.

Laws

India 
Indian Laws Sections 65-77 relate to computer crimes. All the laws are enforced by evidence left digitally and remotely on the computer due to the permanent tracking of our actions on databases.

Section 66: Law preventing the hacking of computers. The crime is punishable by three years in prison or a five lakhs rupee fine.

Section 66F: Law focused on cyber-terrorism such as malware, phishing, unauthorized access, identity theft, etc. If caught, it usually leads to a life sentence.

Section 67B: Law to prevent the spread and publishing of child porn. It could lead to up to 7 years in prison and a ten lakhs rupee fine.

See also
 Certified Computer Examiner
 Certified Forensic Computer Examiner
 Counter forensics
 Cryptanalysis
 Data remanence
 Disk encryption
 Encryption
 Hidden file and hidden directory
 Information technology audit
 MAC times
 Steganalysis
 United States v. Arnold

References

Further reading
 A Practice Guide to Computer Forensics, First Edition (Paperback) by David Benton (Author), Frank Grindstaff (Author)
 
 
 Incident Response and Computer Forensics, Second Edition (Paperback) by Chris Prosise (Author), Kevin Mandia (Author), Matt Pepe (Author) "Truth is stranger than fiction..." (more)

Related journals
 IEEE Transactions on Information Forensics and Security
 Journal of Digital Forensics, Security and Law
 International Journal of Digital Crime and Forensics
 Journal of Digital Investigation
 International Journal of Digital Evidence
 International Journal of Forensic Computer Science
 Journal of Digital Forensic Practice
 Cryptologia
 Small Scale Digital Device Forensic Journal

 
Computer security procedures
Information technology audit